Luciano Galesi (8 November 1926 – 12 May 2002) was an Italian sports shooter. He competed in the 50 m pistol event at the 1952 Summer Olympics.

References

External links
 

1926 births
2002 deaths
Italian male sport shooters
Olympic shooters of Italy
Shooters at the 1952 Summer Olympics
Sportspeople from the Province of Brescia